The 1930 Holy Cross Crusaders football team was an American football team that represented the College of the Holy Cross as an independent during the 1930 college football season.  In its first season under head coach John McEwan, the team compiled an 8–2 record. The team played its home games at Fitton Field in Worcester, Massachusetts.

Schedule

References

Holy Cross
Holy Cross Crusaders football seasons
Holy Cross Crusaders football